Tyler is a city in the U.S. state of Texas and the largest city and county seat of Smith County. It is also the largest city in Northeast Texas. With a 2020 census population of 105,995, Tyler was the 33rd most populous city in Texas and 299th in the United States. It is the principal city of the Greater Tyler metropolitan statistical area, which is the 198th most populous metropolitan area in the U.S. and 16th in Texas after Waco and the College Station–Bryan areas, with a population of 233,479 in 2020.

The city is named for John Tyler, the tenth President of the United States. In 1985, the international Adopt-a-Highway movement began in Tyler. After appeals from local Texas Department of Transportation officials, the local Civitan International chapter adopted a two-mile (three kilometer) stretch of U.S. Route 69 to maintain. Drivers and other motorists traveling on this segment of U.S. 69 (between Tyler and nearby Lindale) will see brown road signs that read, "First Adopt-A-Highway in the World".

Tyler is known as the "Rose Capital of America" (also the "Rose City" and the "Rose Capital of the World"), a nickname it earned from a long history of rose production, cultivation, and processing. It is home to the largest rose garden in the United States, a 14-acre public garden complex that has over 38,000 rose bushes of at least 500 different varieties. The Tyler Rose Garden Center is also home to the annual Texas Rose Festival which attracts thousands of tourists each October.

As Northeast Texas and Smith County's major economic, educational, financial, medical and cultural hub, Tyler is host to more than 20,000 higher-education students; the University of Texas at Tyler; a university health science center; and regional hospital systems. It is also the headquarters for Brookshire Grocery Company, Cavender's, Southside Bank, and Synthesizers.com. Other corporations with major presence within the city and surrounding area include AT&T, T-Mobile US, Cricket Wireless and Metro by T-Mobile, Chase Bank, BBVA, Best Buy, and Walmart. Tyler is also home to the Caldwell Zoo and Broadway Square Mall.

History

Legal recognition of Tyler was initiated by an act of the state legislature on 11 April 1846. The Texas government created Smith County and authorized a county seat.

The first plat designated a 28-block town site centered by a main square within a  tract acquired by Smith County on 6 February 1847. The new town was named for President John Tyler, who advocated for the annexation of Texas by the United States. On 29 January 1850, Tyler was incorporated. Early religious and social institutions included the First Baptist church and a Methodist church, a Masonic lodge and an Odd Fellows lodge, and Tyler's first newspaper.

Though Tyler's early economy from – was based on agriculture, it was also well-diversified during this period. Logging was a second major industry, while complementary manufacturing included metalworking, milling wood, and leather tanning. As the seat of Smith County, the town also benefited from government activity. The local agricultural economy relied on slave labor before the Civil War. In 1860, the population of enslaved people in Smith County was 4,982, the 4th most in east Texas.

By 1860, Tyler held over 1,000 enslaved persons, which represented 35 percent of the town's population. There was strong support for secession and the Confederacy within Tyler, as a high percentage of its residents voted for secession and many of its men joined the Confederate Army. The town was secure enough for the Confederate States of America to establish the largest ordinance plant in Texas. In 1870, Bonner and Williams established Tyler's first bank. Though both the Texas and Pacific Railroad and the International Railroad (Texas) eschewed routes through Tyler, the town gained an important rail connection when the Houston and Great Northern built a branch line in 1874.

Toward the end of the nineteenth century, fruit orchards emerged as an important business in the regional economy. Eighty percent of the county's agricultural revenue derived from cotton as it persisted as the dominant crop in the first decades of the twentieth century. Peaches were the principal fruit crop as the county fruit tree inventory surpassed one million by 1900. Disease struck the peach trees, though, and local farmers moved toward growing roses by the 1920s. Twenty years later, most of the U.S. rose supply originated in the Tyler area.

On 29 October 1895, an African American suspect named Robert Henry Hillard was burned at the stake in the Smith County Courthouse Square for the alleged murder of a nineteen-year-old white woman. Denied a trial and due process, Hillard was taken from law enforcement personnel by a white mob. Hillard's executioners were never punished. Later, two entrepreneurs combined photographs from the actual lynching with others staged with actors and sold the 16-image production as a stereographic set. One of the original sets sits in the United States Library of Congress.

In 1912, Dan Davis, an African-American man suspected of attacking a sixteen-year-old white girl named Carrie Johnson, was burned at the stake in the Smith County Courthouse Square.

By 1980, the population grew to 70,508 and the Roman Catholic Diocese of Tyler and East Texas Islamic Society were established in the following years.

During the 2010 East Texas church burnings, two Tyler churches were destroyed, and historic preservation city planning began in 2016 as the population increased and the city continued development.

Geography
The city of Tyler is in the Southern United States, in Northeast Texas. It is sometimes considered part of the wider Ark-La-Tex region where Arkansas, Louisiana, and Texas meet.

Tyler is the county seat of Smith County, and is surrounded by many suburban communities, including Whitehouse, Lindale, New Chapel Hill, Bullard, Edom, Brownsboro, Kilgore, Flint, and Chandler. Tyler is the principal city of the Greater Tyler metropolitan area, and a principal city in the Tyler–Longview area, a conurbation of the Tyler and Longview metropolitan and combined statistical areas.

Cityscape 

Tyler has a modest skyline and downtown area. Its downtown has a unique rustic architecture, mainly in Art Deco and neoclassical styles. Many architectural structures in central Tyler date from the 19th and early 20th centuries. Modernist and postmodernist era structures are also present throughout the cityscape.

Central Tyler is anchored by Brick Streets Historic District and Charnwood Residential Historic District, areas characterized by dense retail, restaurants, nightlife, and historic landmarks. Brick Streets Historic District is the largest geographic area of Tyler. It encompasses 29 blocks and primarily consists of buildings constructed in the 1900s. The district area is predominantly residential though it sometimes serves as a mix-use district. Brick Streets Historic District has brick-paved streets and stone-lined drainage channels. Nearby, Charnwood is Tyler's first historic district. It comprises 12 blocks of late 19th and early 20th century architecture.

Climate 
Tyler experiences weather typical of East Texas, which is unpredictable, especially in the spring. All of East Texas has the humid subtropical climate typical of the American South.

Severe thunderstorms with heavy rain, hail, damaging winds and tornadoes occur in the area during the spring and summer months. Summer months are hot and humid, with maximum temperatures exceeding  an average of 91 days per year, with high to very high relative average humidity.

Demographics

With a population of 2,423 at the 1880 United States census, the city of Tyler grew to become the most populous city in Northeast Texas, and 33rd most populous in Texas as of 2020. Having a census-tabulated citywide population of 105,995 at the 2020 census, its metropolitan statistical area became the largest in the region, followed by the Longview metropolitan area. The Tyler metropolitan area had 233,479 residents in 2020, and the Tyler–Longview area had an estimated population of 371,015 in 2018. When the U.S. Census Bureau released population estimates for 2021, Tyler was estimated to have a population of 107,192 as of July 1, 2021.

Among the city's growing population, there were 46,320 households and 43,733 housing units. Of the units at the 2019 American Community Survey, 37,504 were occupied and the majority were single-unit detached homes. Tylerites had a home-ownership rate of 51.7%, and renters occupied 48.3% of the housing units from 2014 to 2019's census estimates. Owner-occupied housing units had a median cost of $164,700, and the median cost with a mortgage was $1,408 while houses without a mortgage had a median cost of $487; renters paid a median of $1,011 a month, and 1,148 rental-units had no rent paid among the population. Overall, the city of Tyler is more affordable than nearby Dallas.

A predominantly middle-class community, the city of Tyler had a median income of $52,294 and mean income of $75,349. Families had a median income of $66,579; married-couple families $85,181; and non-family households $32,263. Down from a poverty rate of 16.7% in 2018, approximately 12.6% of the population lived at or below the poverty line in 2019.

Race and ethnicity 

As of the 2020 United States census, there were 105,995 people, 37,114 households, and 23,081 families residing in the city. According to the United States Census Bureau, the city has also diversified from being historically dominated by non-Hispanic whites to being increasingly multiracial. Immigration and white flight over the 20th century have contributed significantly to this area's demographic readjustment. At the 2010 United States census, 60.5% of the population identified as White Americans; by the 2018 American Community Survey, they made up an estimated 49.4% of the total population. Since the 2020 census, Black and African Americans, Asian Americans, multiracial Americans, and people of some other racial or ethnic identity increased to form a total of 55,210 residents against the city's 50,785 non-Hispanic whites. At least 24,023 Tylerites were Hispanic or Latino American of any race as of 2020.

Religion 

Sperling's BestPlaces determined 73.2% of Tylerites and the surrounding area identified as religious or spiritual as of 2020. As part of the Bible Belt, Protestant Christianity is the largest religious group, followed by Roman Catholic Christianity. According to the study, 31.1% of Tylerite Christians identified as Baptist, primarily affiliated with the Texas Baptists, Southern Baptist Convention, National Baptist Convention, USA, Inc, National Baptist Convention of America, and Full Gospel Baptist Church Fellowship. The Roman Catholic community of Tyler and its metropolitan area have been primarily served by the Roman Catholic Diocese of Tyler. Following, 6.6% of the population were Methodists, mainly affiliated with the United Methodist Church and African Methodist Episcopal Church.

Pentecostals formed the fourth-largest Christian group in Tyler (5.2%) and the largest Pentecostal bodies within the area as of 2020 are the Assemblies of God USA and the United Pentecostal Church, prominent Trinitarian and Oneness Pentecostal denominations. An estimated 1.2% of the religiously affiliated population were Latter-day Saints. Of the Christian population, 0.9% identified as Anglicans or Episcopalians, 0.7% Presbyterian, and 0.6% Lutheran. Roughly 13.6% of Tylerites are of another Christian faith including the Eastern Orthodox Church and Jehovah's Witnesses.

The Anglican or Episcopalian community are divided between the Episcopal Church in the United States and Anglican Church in North America. The Episcopal Church USA-affiliated Episcopal Diocese of Texas has congregations in Tyler. The Anglican Church in North America also has congregations in Tyler and its metropolitan area. The Diocese of Mid-America is the ACNA's diocese in Tyler, consisting of one church as of 2020. This diocese is also a member of the Reformed Episcopal Church. Presbyterian and Lutheran bodies operating in the area include the Presbyterian Church (USA) and Presbyterian Church in America, and the Lutheran Church (Missouri Synod) and North American Lutheran Church. The Eastern Orthodox community is served by the Orthodox Church in America's Diocese of the South with its headquarters in nearby Dallas.

Per Sperling's BestPlaces, approximately 0.1% of the city's population affiliated with Judaism compared to the state average of 0.2%, and 0.4% of the area identified as Muslims. The area's Islamic community is affiliated with the East Texas Islamic Society.

Economy

In addition to the city's role in the rose-growing industry, Tyler is the headquarters for Brookshire Grocery Company, which operates Brookshire's, Fresh, Super 1 Foods, and Spring Market supermarkets in the Ark-La-Tex and parts of Dallas–Fort Worth. The company's main distribution center is in south Tyler, while SouthWest Foods, a subsidiary that processes dairy products, is just northeast of the city.

The city and metropolitan area also has a growing manufacturing sector including: Tyler Pipe, a subsidiary of McWane Inc. that produces soil and utility pipe products; Trane Technologies Inc., formerly a unit of American Standard Companies, which manufactures air conditioners and heat pumps (this plant was originally built in 1955 by General Electric); Delek Refining, an Israeli-owned oil refinery formerly La Gloria Oil and Gas Co (a Crown Central Petroleum subsidiary); PCSFerguson, an operating company of Dover Corporation that specializes in equipment for the measurement and production of natural gas using the plunger lift method; DYNAenergetics Tyler Distribution Center, part of DYNAenergetics USA, which manufactures perforating equipment and explosives for the oil and gas industry; and Vesuvius USA, a manufacturer of refractory ceramics used in the steel industry.

According to the city's 2012–2013 Comprehensive Annual Financial Report, the city's top ten employers were:

Recreation and tourism

Annually, the Texas Rose Festival draws thousands of tourists to Tyler. The festival, which celebrates the role of the rose-growing industry in the local economy, is held in October and features a parade, the coronation of the Rose Queen, and other civic events. The Rose Museum is within the Tyler Municipal Rose Garden and features the history of the festival. 

Tyler is also home to Caldwell Zoo, several local museums, Lake Palestine, Lake Tyler, and numerous golf courses and country clubs. A few miles away in Flint, Texas is The WaterPark @ The Villages, a year-round, indoor water park.

There is also an "Azalea Trail" in Tyler, which consists of two officially designated routes within the city that showcase homes or other landscaped venues adorned with azalea shrubs. The Azalea Trail also is home to the long-standing tradition of the Azalea Belles. The official greeters of the Azalea Trail are known as the Azalea Belles, young women from the Tyler area who dress in antebellum gowns. The belles are chosen each year from area high schools or home school families.

Tyler State Park, a few miles north of the city limits, attracts visitors with opportunities to camp, canoe, and paddle boat on the lake. Other available pastimes include picnicking, boating (motors allowed – 5 mph speed limit), boat rentals, fishing, birding, hiking, mountain biking, hiking trails, lake swimming (in unsupervised swimming area), and nature study.

The Smith County Historical Society operates a museum and archives in the old Carnegie Library. The East Texas State Fair is held annually in Tyler. Harvey Convention Center, the largest building at Tyler's fairgrounds is slated for demolition in August 2021. Lake Tyler was the location of the HGTV Dream Home contest in 2005. The  house helped to boost tourism and interest in the community and surrounding areas.

Historical

Tyler has a Cotton Belt Railroad Depot Museum near the Chamber of Commerce office.

Individuals and business firms dedicated to discovering, collecting, and preserving data, records, and other items relating to the history of Smith County, Texas, founded The Smith County Historical Society, a 501(c)(3) non-profit organization, in 1959. The society operates a museum and archives in the former Carnegie Public Library building in downtown Tyler. Permanent museum exhibits include life-size dioramas of Smith County history, with topics ranging from the Caddo Indians to the 20th century.

Other items from the society's collections are showcased in revolving, temporary exhibits. The society's archival library contains historical artifacts of Smith County, including newspapers, city directories, school records, photographs, maps, historical papers, and rare books. The archives are open to the public for research on a limited schedule with volunteer staff on duty. The society is also the official caretaker of Camp Ford Historic Park.

Camp Ford was the largest Confederate Prisoner of War camp west of the Mississippi River during the American Civil War. The original site of the camp stockade is a public historic park managed by the Smith County Historical Society. The park contains a kiosk, paved trail, interpretive signage, a cabin reconstruction, and a picnic area.

Sports

College and university teams

 University of Texas at Tyler Patriots (NCAA Division II)
 Texas College Steers (HBCU)
 Tyler Junior College Apaches (NJCAA)

Baseball teams

 Tyler Elbertas (1912)
 Tyler Trojans (1924–1929, 1931, 1935–1940, 1946–1950)
 Tyler Sports (1932)
 Tyler Governors (1933–1934)
 Tyler East Texans (1950–1953)
 Tyler Tigers (1954–1955)
 Tyler Wildcatters (1994–1997)
 Tyler Roughnecks (2001)

Football
 East Texas Twisters (2004)

Road races
 Fresh 15 Road Race (Annual)

Soccer
 Tyler FC (2016–Present)

Disc golf
 Tyler features fifteen disc golf courses and seven leagues, and the surrounding area features a total of thirty-six courses and seventeen leagues. For these reasons, users of the disc golf app UDisc ranked Tyler as the third best disc golf destination in Texas and second best in the United States.

Government

Local government

According to the city's 2009 Comprehensive Annual Financial Report, the city's various funds had $87.7 million in revenues, $101.7 million in expenditures, $49.2 million in total assets, $12.3 million in total liabilities, and $17.6 million in cash in investments.

 McDonald Lorance, 1846
 William Bartlett, 
 ?
 Oscar Burton, 
 Zeb J. Spruiell, 
 ?
 Murph Wilson, 1967
 ?
 Jack H. Halbert, 1970–1976
 ?
 Norman Shtofman, 1982–1984
 Smith Reynolds, Junior
 Kevin Eltife, 
 Joey Seeber, 2002–2008
 Barbara Bass, 2008–2014
 Martin Heines, 2014–2020
 Don Warren, 2020–present

The Northeast Texas Public Health District is a political subdivision under the State of Texas established by the City of Tyler and Smith County. In place for nearly 70 years, the Health District became a separate entity in 1994, with an administrative Public Health Board. With a stated vision "To be the Healthiest Community in Texas", the district has a full-time staff of over 130 employees. The Health District has a broad range of services and responsibilities dedicated to their mission: "To Protect, Promote, and Provide for the Health of Our Community."

State government

Tyler is represented in the Texas Senate by Republican Bryan Hughes, District 1, and in the Texas House of Representatives by Republican Matt Schaefer, District 6. The Texas Twelfth Court of Appeals is in Tyler. The Texas Department of Criminal Justice operates the Region I Parole Division Office and the Tyler District Parole Office in Tyler.

Federal government

The two U.S. senators from Texas are Republicans John Cornyn and Ted Cruz. Tyler is part of Texas's 1st congressional district, which is currently represented by Republican Nathaniel Moran. The United States Postal Service operates several post offices in Tyler, including Tyler, Azalea, Southeast Crossing, and the South Tyler Annex.

Education

Colleges and universities

Tyler's higher education institutions include the University of Texas at Tyler and the University of Texas Health Center at Tyler, both part of the University of Texas System, as well as Texas College, the city's only HBCU, and Tyler Junior College.

Primary and secondary schools

Public primary and secondary education for much of the city is provided by the Tyler Independent School District, which includes high schools Tyler High School (previously known as John Tyler High School) and Tyler Legacy High School (previously known as Robert E. Lee High School), as well as Tyler ISD Early College High School, Premier High School of Tyler, a public charter school (Cumberland Academy). Several Tyler schools offer international baccalaureate and advanced placement programs.

Tyler is also home to the University of Texas at Tyler University Academy at Tyler, a K–12 public charter operated by the University of Texas at Tyler since 2012 that offers university courses to students in grades 9–12.

Portions of incorporated Tyler are served by surrounding school districts. These include sections of southeast Tyler, served by the Whitehouse Independent School District, and some sections in the east which are served by the chapel Hill Independent School District.

Private schools

There are also private schools in Tyler, including Grace Community School (Texas), All Saints Episcopal School, Seventh-day Adventist Church School, King's Academy Christian School, Kingdom Life Academy (in the same building but not affiliated with King's Academy), Christian Heritage School, East Texas Christian Academy, and Good Shepherd Reformed Episcopal School. The Brook Hill School in nearby Bullard, TX, also serves the Tyler area. The Tyler Catholic School System of the Catholic Diocese of Tyler consists of St. Gregory Cathedral School and Bishop Thomas K. Gorman Regional Catholic Middle and High School.

Media
Tyler has 24 media outlets and one newspaper. There are many others in the surrounding area.

Newspaper
Tyler Morning Telegraph

Television

Radio

AM stations

FM stations

Healthcare
Hospitals in Tyler include UT Health Tyler, Trinity Mother Frances Health System, UT Health North Campus Tyler, and Texas Spine & Joint Hospital. There are also many clinics including the Direct Care Clinic.

Transportation

The most common form of transportation is the motor vehicle. Tyler is a nexus of several major highways. Interstate 20 runs along the north edge of the city going east and west, U.S. Highway 69 runs north–south through the center of town and State Highway 64 runs east–west through the city. Tyler also has access to U.S. Highway 271, State Highway 31, State Highway 155, and State Highway 110. Loop 323 was established in 1957 and encircles the city, which has continued to grow outside of this loop. Loop 49 is a limited access "outer loop" around the city and currently runs from State Highway 110 south of Tyler to US 69 northwest of Tyler near Lindale.

Public transportation

Tyler Transit provides customers with public transportation service within the City of Tyler. The buses run daily, excluding Sundays and holidays. Tyler Transit offers customers the option to purchase tickets, tokens, or passes at the Tyler Transit office, at 210 E. Oakwood Street inside the Cotton Belt Railroad Depot at the main transfer point. The City of Tyler paratransit service is a shared-ride, public transportation service. Requests for service must be made the day before the service is needed. Trips can be scheduled up to 14 days in advance. ADA compliant paratransit service is provided to all origins and destinations within the service area defined as the city limits of Tyler. Greyhound Lines bus service is available through a downtown terminal.

Air
Tyler Pounds Regional Airport offers service to and from Dallas–Fort Worth International Airport via American Eagle, providing service with Embraer ERJ-135 and ERJ-145 regional jets. General Aviation services are provided by two fixed-base operators, Johnson Aviation and the Jet Center of Tyler.

Train
Tyler was the hub for a series of short-line railroads which later evolved into the St. Louis Southwestern Railway, better known as "The Cotton Belt Route," with the city last being a stop on the unnamed successor to the Morning Star between St. Louis and Dallas. This line later became part of the Southern Pacific Railroad, which itself merged with the Union Pacific Railroad, which continues to serve the city today with freight traffic. No passenger train service to Tyler has occurred since April 1956, but Amtrak's Texas Eagle runs through the city of Mineola, a short distance north of Tyler.

Walkability
A 2014 study by Walk Score ranked Tyler with a walkability score of 32 (out of 100) with some amenities within walking distance.

Notable events
 Fragments of the Space Shuttle Columbia landed near Tyler in 2003, following the breakup of it in the atmosphere.
 On the evening of 2009, a fire engulfed a number of historic buildings in downtown Tyler. Eight different fire departments responded to the fire.
 The 1982 Supreme Court case Plyler v. Doe, which prohibited denying schooling to immigrant children, originated in the Tyler Independent School District.
 The Tyler courthouse shooting occurred in 2005, when David Arroyo fatally shot his ex-wife and a man in the Tyler Square inside the Smith County Courthouse.

Notable people

Sister cities
Tyler's sister cities are:
 Lo Barnechea, Chile
 Jelenia Góra, Poland
 Liberia, Costa Rica
 San Miguel de Allende, Mexico
 Yachiyo, Japan

See also

Cotton Belt Depot Train Museum
List of museums in East Texas
Tyler Museum of Art
Whitaker-McClendon House

Notes

References

Further reading
 Austin, Gladys Peters, Along the Century Trail: Early History of Tyler, Texas (Dallas: Avalon Press, 1946)
 Burton, Morris Tyler as an Early Railroad Center, Chronicles of Smith County, Spring 1963
 Betts, Vicki, Smith County, Texas, in the Civil War (Tyler, Texas: Smith County Historical Society, 1978)
 Everett, Dianna, The Texas Cherokees: A People between Two Fires, 1819–1840 (Norman: University of Oklahoma Press, 1990)
 Glover, ed., Robert W., Tyler and Smith County, Texas (n.p.: Walsworth, 1976)
 Henderson, Adele, Smith County, Texas: Its Background and History in Ante-Bellum Days (M.A. thesis, University of Texas, 1926)
 McDonald, Archie P. Historic Smith County (Historical Publishing Network, 2006).
 Reed, Robert E. Jr. Images of America: Tyler (Arcadia Publishing, 2008).
 Reed, Robert E. Jr. Postcard History: Tyler (Arcadia Publishing, 2009).
 Smith County Historical Society, Historical Atlas of Smith County (Tyler, Texas: Tyler Print Shop, 1965)
 Wardlaw, Trevor P. "Sires and Sons: The Story of Hubbard's Regiment." CreateSpace Independent Publishing Platform, 2015. 
 Whisenhunt, Donald W. comp., Chronological History of Smith County (Tyler, Texas: Smith County Historical Society, 1983)
 Woldert, Albert, A History of Tyler and Smith County (San Antonio: Naylor, 1948)

External links

 City Of Tyler Website Official City Website

 
Cities in Texas
County seats in Texas
Cities in Smith County, Texas
Cities in the Ark-La-Tex
County seats in the Ark-La-Tex
Populated places established in 1846
History of Tyler, Texas